Charles François Marie Baron was Governor (later High Commissioner) of French India from March 1946 to May 1949.

References

Titles

French colonial governors and administrators
Governors of French India